Oakwood Historic District may refer to:

 Vine-Oakwood-Green Bay Road Historic District, Lake Forest, IL, listed on the NRHP in Illinois
 Oakwood Historic District (Hickory, North Carolina), listed on the NRHP in North Carolina
 Oakwood Historic District (High Point, North Carolina), listed on the NRHP in North Carolina
 Oakwood Historic District (Raleigh, North Carolina), listed on the NRHP in North Carolina
 Oakwood-Chimborazo Historic District, Richmond, VA, listed on the NRHP in Virginia
 Oakwood Historic District, East Lansing, MI